Methylobacterium jeotgali  is a Gram-negative, strictly aerobic, motile and rod-shaped bacteria from the genus of Methylobacterium which has been isolated from fermented seafood jeotgal in Korea.

References

Further reading

External links
Type strain of Methylobacterium jeotgali at BacDive -  the Bacterial Diversity Metadatabase

Hyphomicrobiales
Bacteria described in 2007